Dropout (stylized as Dropout.tv, DROPOUT, or :DROPOUT) is an American subscription media service provider developed and operated by CH Media. It was founded in September 2018 and provides advertisement-free access to uncensored original shows.

History
In early September 2018, CollegeHumor began teasing the beginning of a new subscription service, putting hidden keyword clues on their website and in their videos. Entering these keywords to a website owned by CollegeHumor allowed users to see clips of videos, audio, and images that implied the beginning of a new CollegeHumor project.

On September 26, 2018, Dropout officially launched in the United States. CH Media's CEO, Rich Cusick, announced the service as a "TV-MA version of CollegeHumor", allowing fans to dive deeper into pre-established characters and shows from the primary CollegeHumor YouTube channel. CollegeHumor's Chief Creative Officer, Sam Reich, also claims that the founding of Dropout was in response to difficulty in receiving advertising dollars on traditional media platforms for mature content.

Dropout officially launched native iOS and Android apps for its service in December 2018, allowing users to watch shows and also cast to smart TVs. Comics, especially the chat stories, were integrated into the app.

As of December 2018, visitors to the service spent on average 31 minutes per visit, and visited on average 3.5 times per week.

Throughout 2019, Dropout began to experiment with more live streaming versions of their shows, through using Twitch and podcast-like formats.

After IAC had let go of CollegeHumor in 2020, Dropout ended production on scripted shows and focused on unscripted shows such as Um Actually, Dimension 20 and Game Changer through online conference.

Subscription model
Dropout launched with a beta price of $3.99 per month, for the first three months of the service. After December 2018, the price rose to a three tiered option, with monthly memberships for $5.99/month, semi-annual memberships for $4.99/month, and annual memberships for $3.99/month. As of January 4th 2022, new subscribers paid $5.99 monthly or $59.99 yearly, while those who already subscribed prior to that date were charged $4.99 monthly or $47.99 yearly. Users are also able to access Dropout content through YouTube via the join function.The company has justified the pricing model as allowing them to create content without being dependent on, or beholden to, requests from advertisers.

In August 2019, CollegeHumor also began to partner with Facebook to offer Dropout content via paid video subscriptions on Facebook's platform.

Services
In addition to viewing exclusive original series, subscription to Dropout allows users to view all other videos produced by CollegeHumor 72 hours before they are released to the public. Previously, a subscriber-only Discord server was included as a service, but the server has since been opened to non-subscribers as well. Dropout also has a store which sells merchandise (such as shirts, stickers, and mugs) related to shows on the platform.

Original shows
Dropout planned to release a new original title per month in 2019, according to Sam Reich.

References

External links 
 Official website

IAC (company)
Streaming media systems
Subscription video on demand services
CollegeHumor